Melothria cucumis is a species of flowering plant in the cucurbit family native to Bolivia, Paraguay, Peru, Uruguay, and parts of Argentina and Brazil. Plants use tendrils to climb.

References 

Cucurbitoideae